Sophia Magdalena Scholl (9 May 1921 – 22 February 1943) was a German student and anti-Nazi political activist, active within the White Rose non-violent resistance group in Nazi Germany.

She was convicted of high treason after having been found distributing anti-war leaflets at the University of Munich (LMU) with her brother, Hans. For her actions, she was executed by guillotine. Since the 1970s, Scholl has been extensively commemorated for her anti-Nazi resistance work.

Early life 
Scholl was the daughter of Magdalena (née Müller) and Robert Scholl, a liberal politician, and ardent Nazi critic, who was the mayor of her hometown of Forchtenberg am Kocher in the Free People's State of Württemberg at the time of her birth. She was the fourth of six children:

 Inge Aicher-Scholl (1917–1998)
 Hans Scholl (1918–1943)
 Elisabeth Hartnagel-Scholl (27 February 1920 – 28 February 2020), married Sophie's long-term boyfriend, Fritz Hartnagel
 Sophie Scholl (1921–1943)
 Werner Scholl (1922–1944) missing in action and presumed dead in June 1944
 Thilde Scholl (1925–1926)

Scholl was brought up in the Lutheran church. She entered junior or grade school at the age of seven, learned easily, and had a carefree childhood. In 1930, the family moved to Ludwigsburg and then two years later to Ulm where her father had a business consulting office.

In 1932, Scholl began attending a secondary school for girls. At the age of 12, she chose to join the Bund Deutscher Mädel (League of German Girls), as did most of her classmates. Her initial enthusiasm gradually gave way to criticism. She was aware of the dissenting political views of her father, friends, and some teachers. Her own brother Hans, who once eagerly participated in the Hitler Youth program, became entirely disillusioned with the Nazi Party. Political attitude had become an essential criterion in her choice of friends. The arrest of her brothers and friends in 1937 for participating in the German Youth Movement left a strong impression on her.

She had a talent for drawing and painting and for the first time, came into contact with a few so-called "degenerate" artists. An avid reader, she developed a growing interest in philosophy and theology.

In spring 1940, she graduated from secondary school, where the subject of her essay was "The Hand that Moved the Cradle, Moved the World, a poem by William Ross Wallace." Scholl almost did not graduate, having lost all desire to participate in the classes which had largely become Nazi indoctrination. Being fond of children, she became a kindergarten teacher at the Fröbel Institute in Ulm. She had also chosen this job hoping that it would be recognized as an alternative service in the Reichsarbeitsdienst (National Labor Service), a prerequisite for admission to university. This was not the case and in spring 1941 she began a six-month stint in the auxiliary war service as a nursery teacher in Blumberg. The military-like regimen of the Labor Service caused her to rethink her understanding of the political situation and to begin practising passive resistance.

After her six months in the National Labor Service, in May 1942, she enrolled at the University of Munich as a student of biology and philosophy. Her brother Hans, who was studying medicine at the same institution, introduced her to his friends. Although this group of friends eventually was known for their political views, they initially were drawn together by a shared love of art, music, literature, philosophy, and theology. Hiking in the mountains, skiing, and swimming were also of importance to them. They often attended concerts, plays, and lectures together.

In Munich, Scholl met a number of artists, writers, and philosophers, particularly Carl Muth and Theodor Haecker, who were important contacts for her. The question they pondered the most was how the individual must act under a dictatorship. During the summer vacation in 1942, Scholl had to do war service in a metallurgical plant in Ulm. At the same time, her father was serving time in prison for having made a critical remark to an employee about Adolf Hitler.

Origins of the White Rose 

Between 1940 and 1941, Scholl's brother, Hans Scholl, a former member of the Hitler Youth, began questioning the principles and policies of the Nazi regime. As a student at the University of Munich, Hans met two Roman Catholic men of letters who redirected his life, inspiring him to turn from studying medicine and pursue religion, philosophy, and the arts. Gathering around him like-minded friends, Alexander Schmorell, Willi Graf, and Jurgen Wittenstein, they eventually adopted a strategy of passive resistance towards the Nazis by writing and publishing leaflets that called for the toppling of National Socialism, calling themselves the White Rose. 

The activities of the White Rose started in June 1942. From end of June until mid July 1942, Hans Scholl and Alexander Schmorell wrote the first four leaflets. Quoting extensively from the Bible, Aristotle and Novalis, as well as Goethe and Schiller, the iconic poets of German bourgeoisie, they appealed to what they considered the German intelligentsia, believing that these people would be easily convinced by the same arguments that also motivated the authors themselves. These leaflets were left in telephone books in public phone booths, mailed to professors and students, and taken by courier to other universities for distribution.

Sophie is believed to have first learned about the White Rose in July 1942, but Fritz Hartnagel remembers her asking him in May 1942 if he could get her a pass to buy a duplicating machine (impossible to get in Nazi Germany without a signed and countersigned form), which suggests that perhaps she knew about the activities sooner than thought. Whenever she joined, she proved to be valuable to the group because, as a woman, her chances of being randomly stopped by the SS were much smaller.

Arrest and execution 
On 18 February 1943, Sophie and Hans Scholl went to the Ludwig Maximilian University to leave flyers out for the students to read. The Scholls brought a suitcase full of leaflets to the university main building, and hurriedly dropped stacks of copies in the empty corridors for students to find when they left the lecture rooms. Leaving before the lectures had ended, the Scholls noticed that there were some left-over copies in the suitcase and decided to distribute them. Sophie flung the last remaining leaflets from the top floor down into the atrium. This spontaneous action was observed by the university maintenance man, Jakob Schmid, a self-avowed Nazi, who had joined the Nazi Party in 1937. 

Hans and Sophie Scholl were taken into the custody of the Gestapo. A draft of a seventh pamphlet, written by Christoph Probst, was found in the possession of Hans Scholl at the time of his arrest by the Gestapo. While Sophie Scholl was able to hide incriminating evidence in an empty classroom shortly before she was captured, Hans tried to destroy the draft of the last leaflet by tearing it apart and trying to swallow it. The Gestapo recovered enough of it to read what it said, and, when pressed, Hans gave the name of the author, Christoph Probst. In his second interrogation, he stated: "The piece of paper that I tore up following my arrest this morning originated with Christoph Probst... All other persons with the exception of Probst are in my opinion not guilty." Christoph Probst was captured on February 20, 1943.

The main Gestapo interrogator was Robert Mohr, who initially thought Sophie was innocent. However, after Hans had confessed, Sophie assumed full responsibility in an attempt to protect other members of the White Rose.

In the People's Court before Judge Roland Freisler on 22 February 1943, Scholl was recorded as saying these words:

No testimony was allowed for the defendants; this was their only defense.

On 22 February 1943, Scholl, her brother, Hans, and their friend, Christoph Probst, were found guilty of treason and condemned to death. They were all beheaded by guillotine by executioner Johann Reichhart in Munich's Stadelheim Prison. Sophie was executed at 5 pm, while Hans was executed at 5:02 pm and Christoph was executed at 5:05 pm. The execution was supervised by Walter Roemer, the enforcement chief of the Munich district court. Prison officials were impressed by the condemned prisoners' bravery, and let them smoke cigarettes together before they were executed.

Sophie's last known words are disputed, although Else Gebel remembers the last words Sophie said to her as:

As for her last words, they were most likely either "God, my refuge into eternity." or "The sun still shines."

Fritz Hartnagel was evacuated from Stalingrad in January 1943, but did not return to Germany before Sophie was executed. In October 1945, he married Sophie's sister Elisabeth.

Legacy 
After her death, a copy of the sixth leaflet was smuggled out of Germany through Scandinavia to England by German jurist Helmuth James Graf von Moltke, where it was used by the Allied Forces. In mid-1943, the Royal Air Force dropped millions of propaganda copies of the tract over Germany, now retitled The Manifesto of the Students of Munich.

Playwright Lillian Garrett-Groag said in Newsday on 22 February 1993, that "It is possibly the most spectacular moment of resistance that I can think of in the twentieth century ... The fact that five little kids, in the mouth of the wolf, where it really counted, had the tremendous courage to do what they did, is spectacular to me. I know that the world is better for them having been there, but I do not know why."

In the same issue of Newsday, Holocaust historian Jud Newborn observed that "You cannot really measure the effect of this kind of resistance in whether or not X number of bridges were blown up or a regime fell ... The White Rose really has a more symbolic value, but that's a very important value."

On 22 February 2003, a bust of Scholl was placed by the government of Bavaria in the Walhalla temple in her honour. She was the fifth woman to receive that honor.

The Geschwister-Scholl-Institut ("Scholl Siblings Institute") for Political Science at the Ludwig Maximilian University of Munich (LMU) is named in honour of Sophie Scholl and her brother Hans. The institute is home to the university's political science and communication departments, and is housed in the former Radio Free Europe building close to the city's Englischer Garten.

Many local schools as well as countless streets and squares in Germany, and also Austria, have been named after Scholl and her brother.

In 2003, Germans were invited by television broadcaster ZDF to participate in Unsere Besten (Our Best), a nationwide competition to choose the top ten most important Germans of all time. Voters under the age of 40 helped Scholl and her brother Hans to finish in fourth place, above Bach, Goethe, Gutenberg, Bismarck, Willy Brandt, and Albert Einstein. If the votes of young viewers alone had been counted, Sophie and Hans Scholl would have been ranked first. Several years earlier, readers of Brigitte, a German magazine for women, voted Scholl "the greatest woman of the twentieth century".

On 9 May 2014, Google depicted Scholl for its Google Doodle on the occasion of what would have been her 93rd birthday.

In April 2021, the German Ministry of Finance issued a commemorative sterling silver €20 coin celebrating the 100th anniversary of Scholl’s birth.

In popular culture

Film and television 
In the 1970s and 1980s, there were three film accounts of Sophie Scholl and the White Rose resistance. The first TV film Der Pedell (1971) focused on the university maintenance man Jakob Schmid, who denounced Scholl and the other White Rose members. The TV film was produced for the West German ZDF. Percy Adlon's Fünf letzte Tage (Five Last Days, 1982) presented Lena Stolze as Scholl in her last days from the point of view of her cellmate Else Gebel. Stolze repeated the role in Michael Verhoeven's Die Weiße Rose (The White Rose, 1982). In an interview, Stolze said that playing the role was "an honour".

In February 2005, a film about Scholl's last days, Sophie Scholl – Die letzten Tage (Sophie Scholl – The Final Days), featuring Julia Jentsch in the title role, was released. Drawing on interviews with survivors and transcripts that had remained hidden in East German archives until 1990, it was nominated for an Academy Award for Best Foreign Language Film in January 2006. For her portrayal of Scholl, Jentsch won the best actress at the European Film Awards, best actress at the German Film Awards (Lolas), along with the Silver Bear for best actress at the Berlin Film Festival.

The German TV docudrama Frauen die Geschichte machten – Sophie Scholl was broadcast in 2013. Sophie Scholl was played by Liv Lisa Fries.

She was portrayed by Victoria Chilap in the documentary movie Death of a Nation in 2018.

In literature 
In February 2009, The History Press published Sophie Scholl: The Real Story of the Woman who Defied Hitler by Frank McDonough.

In February 2010, Carl Hanser Verlag released Sophie Scholl: A Biography (in German), by Barbara Beuys.

In theatre 
American playwright Lillian Garrett-Groag's play The White Rose features Scholl as a major character.

We Will Not Be Silent, a dramatization by David Meyers of Scholl's imprisonment and interrogation, premiered at the Contemporary American Theater Festival in Shepherdstown, West Virginia in July, 2017.

In later life Whitney Seymour, his wife Catryna, and their daughters Tryntje and Gabriel, co-wrote and produced Stars in the Dark Sky, a one-act play about Hans and Sophie Scholl and their role in the White Rose resistance group in Nazi Germany in the 1940s. The play, which took around five years to write, was released in 2008 (when Seymour was 85) and had five performances off-Broadway.

In music 
George Donaldson, a Scottish folk singer wrote a song called "The White Rose" on an album titled the same, about Sophie and the White Rose movement.

The English punk band Zatopeks released an eponymous love song for Sophie Scholl on their debut album (2005).

Mickey 3D, a French rock band, wrote a song called "La Rose Blanche" on an album titled Sebolavy (2016).

American rock band Sheer Mag recorded a song called "(Say Goodbye to) Sophie Scholl" on its 2017 debut album Need to Feel Your Love.

Reg Meuross, a British folk singer, released "For Sophie" on his album Faraway People in 2017.

Social media 
Under the title @ichbinsophiescholl the German broadcasters Südwestrundfunk and Bayerische Rundfunk began in May 2021 an Instagram project to commemorate Scholl's 100th birthday. The last months of Scholl's life are featured on Instagram posts and stories styled as if Scholl herself were posting them. The actress Luna Wedler plays Sophie Scholl and illustrates the last year of her life in the style of a modern digital influencer.

Further reading
 Aretz, Bernd: Sophie Scholl. Der Mut, sich selbst treu zu sein. Ein Lebensbild. Neue Stadt Verlag, München 2013, .
 Bald, Detlef: "Wider die Kriegsmaschinerie". Kriegserfahrungen und Motive des Widerstandes der "Weißen Rose". Klartext Verlag, Essen 2005, .
 Beuys, Barbara: Sophie Scholl. Biografie. Carl Hanser Verlag, München 2010, .
Breinersdorfer, Fred (Editor), Sophie Scholl – Die letzten Tage, 2005.
 
 Leisner, Barbara: "Ich würde es genauso wieder machen". Sophie Scholl. List Verlag, Berlin 2005, .
 McDonough, Frank: Sophie Scholl: The Real Story of the Woman who Defied Hitler. The History Press, 2009,  (als Hardcover),  (als Taschenbuch).
 Selg, Peter: "Wir haben alle unsere Maßstäbe in uns selbst." Der geistige Weg von Hans und Sophie Scholl. Verlag des Goetheanums, Dornach 2006, .
 Sichtermann, Barbara: Wer war Sophie Scholl? , Berlin 2008, .
 Vinke, Hermann: ‚‘Das kurze Leben der Sophie Scholl.‘‘ Ravensburger Buchverlag 1980, .
 Vinke, Hermann: "Hoffentlich schreibst Du recht bald." Sophie Scholl und Fritz Hartnagel, eine Freundschaft 1937–1943. Maier Verlag, Ravensburg 2006, .
 Waage, Peter N.: Es lebe die Freiheit! – Traute Lafrenz und die Weiße Rose. Aus dem Norwegischen von Antje Subey-Cramer. Urachhaus, Stuttgart 2012, .
 Wilson, Kip: White Rose. Boston, MA: Houghton Mifflin Harcourt, 2019, .

See also 

 Geschwister-Scholl-Preis
 Helmuth Hübener
 Otto and Elise Hampel
 Swing Kids
 List of peace activists

Notes

References

External links 
 
 
 The Geschwister-Scholl-Institut
 Court documents and testimonies (Center for White Rose Studies)
 Sophie Scholl's childhood years in Ludwigsburg

1921 births
1943 deaths
Executed German Resistance members
Executed German women
Executed activists
Executed revolutionaries
Executed students
German Christian pacifists
German Lutherans
German anti-fascists
German revolutionaries

Ludwig Maximilian University of Munich
Lutheran pacifists
Nonviolence advocates
People executed by Nazi Germany by guillotine
People from Baden-Württemberg executed by Nazi Germany
People from Hohenlohe (district)
People from the Free People's State of Württemberg
Protestants in the German Resistance
White Rose members
Women in World War II
Reich Labour Service members
Hitler Youth members
Female anti-fascists
People executed by Nazi courts